The Taira clan was a major Japanese clan of samurai.

Taira may also refer to:

Taira, Toyama, a village in Toyama prefecture, Japan
Taira, the center of Iwaki, Fukushima, Japan
Taira (spider): a genus of spiders (family Amaurobiidae)
Tayra (Eira barbara), a neotropical Mustelidae

People with the surname
Afonso Taira, Portuguese footballer
, Japanese baseball player
, Gojū Ryū practitioner
Nancy Taira, Mexican actress
 was a Japanese martial artist
Takunori Taira, Japanese engineer
, Japanese textile artist
 Yoshihisa Taira, composer
, Japanese actress

People with the given name or nickname
, Japanese footballer
Yuliia "Taira" Paievska

See also
Tiara (disambiguation)

Japanese-language surnames